Ning Gaoning (born 9 November 1958), also known as Frank Ning, is a Chinese manufacturing executive.

He was born in Binzhou, Shandong Province. He graduated from Shandong University and earned an MBA from the University of Pittsburgh's Katz School of Business in 1987. During his career at China Resources (Huarun), he led over 30 major M&As to make China Resources one of the largest food conglomerate in China. He also served as the Chairman of state-owned China National Cereals, Oils and Foodstuffs Corporation (COFCO). Currently, He is the Chairman of the Sinochem Group. He is also the Chairman of Hong Kong Building and Loan Agency Limited and Deputy Chairman of China Vanke company Limited. Ning has been recognized five times as one of the 25 most influential business leaders by Chinese Entrepreneur magazine. In 2009, Ning was named Asia Business Leader of the Year by CNBC Asia Pacific. In November 2012 Ning was elected as a member of the Central Commission for Discipline Inspection.

Ning was elected Chairman of the Board of Directors of Syngenta on 16 July 2018.

References

1958 births
Living people
Businesspeople from Shandong
China Resources people
COFCO Group people
Joseph M. Katz Graduate School of Business alumni
People from Binzhou
Sinochem Group people
University of Pittsburgh alumni